"Erämaan Viimeinen" (English: Last of the Wilds) is a single by Finnish symphonic metal band Nightwish, released on December 5, 2007.

It is the same song as the instrumental "Last of the Wilds" from the band's album Dark Passion Play, but with Finnish lyrics and Jonsu from Indica on vocals, and became the second single from the album after "Amaranth".

The single was not, like the earlier single "Kuolema Tekee Taiteilijan", released outside Finland, where it peaked at number one in the charts. On January 20, 2010, German magazine Metal Hammer released the CD exclusively with the magazine in German-speaking countries, featuring the CD plus two versions of "Escapist". The song is also included on the Platinum Edition of Dark Passion Play.

"Erämaan viimeinen" is not an exact replica of "Last of the Wilds". It has vocals and lyrics, there is no seashore-sound in the beginning, there is an additional keyboard-track in the C-part and the kantele-outro has been removed.

Track listing

Personnel
Tuomas Holopainen - keyboards
Emppu Vuorinen - lead guitar
Jukka Nevalainen - drums
Marko Hietala - bass

Guests
Jonsu - lead vocals
Troy Donockley - Uilleann pipes

References

External links
Nightwish's Official Website

2007 singles
Number-one singles in Finland
Nightwish songs
Songs written by Tuomas Holopainen
Spinefarm Records singles
2007 songs
Finnish-language songs